Antonio Cantafora (born 2 February 1944), also known professionally as Michael Coby, is an Italian film and television actor.

Life and career 
Born in Crotone (Calabria) Cantafora studied acting with Alessandro Fersen, then he made his film debut in 1967.  Thanks to a vague resemblance to the actor Terence Hill, in the seventies he starred with Paul L. Smith in a brief series of successful action-comedy films that reprise the Bud Spencer-Terence Hill style. Later Cantafora continued his career mainly as character actor, working with prominent directors such as Federico Fellini, Jerzy Skolimowski, Bruno Barreto, Alberto Lattuada, Mauro Bolognini.

Partial filmography 

 The Dirty Outlaws (1967) - (uncredited)
 Lo stato d'assedio (1969) - Umberto
 Ombre roventi (1970)
 And God Said to Cain (1970) - Dick Acombar
 Shoot Joe, and Shoot Again (1971) - Jack's Man
 Black Killer (1971) - Ramon O'Hara
 Baron Blood (1972) - Peter Kleist
 Decameron proibitissimo (Boccaccio mio statte zitto) (1972) - Fra' Domenico
 Novelle galeotte d'amore (1972)
 Bounty Hunter in Trinity (1972) - Pizarro
 Metti lo diavolo tuo ne lo mio inferno (1973) - Ricciardetto
 L'affaire Crazy Capo (1973) - Antonio Marchesi
 Supermen Against the Orient (1973) - Max
 ...e continuavano a mettere lo diavolo ne lo inferno (1973) - Ricciardo
 Carambola! (1974) - Toby
 La badessa di Castro (1974) - Giulio Branciforti
 Carambola's Philosophy: In the Right Pocket (1975) - Coby
 Convoy Buddies (1975) - Toby
 We Are No Angels (1975) - Angel
 The Diamond Peddlers (1976) - Matteo / Butch
 La casa (1976) - Philip
 Carioca tigre (1976) - Carlo Parodi
 Sahara Cross (1977)
 Enfantasme (1978) - Flavio, le hippy
 Midnight Blue (1979) - Pier Luigi
 Supersonic Man (1979) - Paul
 The Bitch (1979) - Nico Cantafora
 The Cricket (1980) - Alberto 'Cipria' Antonelli 
 Gabriela (1983) - Tonico Bastos
 Scream for Help (1984) - Man At Motel
 Demons 2 (1986) - Ingrid's Father
 Puro cashmere (1986) - Jody
 Intervista (1987) - Spouse
 Il coraggio di parlare (1987) - Caporale
 Der Commander (1988) - Nick De Carlo
 Donna d'ombra (1988) - Vincenzo
 Torrents of Spring (1989) - Richter
 Vacanze di Natale '90 (1990) - Pippo
 Il ritorno del grande amico (1990)
 In camera mia (1992) - Mannari
 Giovanni Falcone (1993) - Totuccio Inzerillo
 Power and Lovers (1994) - Toto
 A spasso nel tempo (1996) - Casanova
 Marquise (1997)
 Il decisionista (1997)
 Hammamet Village (1997)
 Buck and the Magic Bracelet (1998) - Sergeant O'Connor
 The Card Player (2004) - Vice Squad Chief Marini
 I Viceré (2007)
 Uno di famiglia (2018) - Cicciuzzo

References

External links 
 

Living people
Italian male film actors
1944 births
People from Calabria
Italian male television actors
People from Crotone
20th-century Italian male actors